Roy Ian Hunter (born 29 October 1973) is an English former professional footballer. He started his career at West Bromwich Albion, before moving to Northampton Town where he made 177 Football League appearances. He then had a brief spell at Nuneaton Borough in the Conference before moving on to Oxford United in 2002, before joining Hucknall Town for their 2003–04 Northern Premier League championship season. He helped to guide Hucknall Town to the FA Trophy Final as player/coach. He signed for Harrogate Town in July 2005.

Hunter was the Harrogate Town captain at the start of the season but was replaced by Denny Ingram midway through the term.

Hunter signed on for Teesside Athletic for the start of the 2008–09 season, with the club becoming Redcar Athletic in 2010. In the summer of 2012 he joined Marske United as a player/coach, before returning to Redcar as assistant manager in October 2012.

Honours
Northampton Town
Football League Third Division play-offs: 1997

References

External links

1973 births
Living people
People from Saltburn-by-the-Sea
English footballers
Association football midfielders
West Bromwich Albion F.C. players
Northampton Town F.C. players
Nuneaton Borough F.C. players
Oxford United F.C. players
Northwich Victoria F.C. players
Hucknall Town F.C. players
Harrogate Town A.F.C. players
Marske United F.C. players
English Football League players
Footballers from North Yorkshire
National League (English football) players
Northern Premier League players